"La dolce vita" is a song written by Larry Forsberg, Sven-Inge Sjöberg and Lennard Wastesson, and originally performed by After Dark (Christer Lindarw and Lasse Flinckman) at Melodifestivalen 2004, where the song competed in the semifinal in Malmö on 13 March 2004, before reaching the final inside the Stockholm Globe Arena, where it ended up 3rd. On stage both men wore pink dresses, the same style as Lena Philipsson wore when her song "Det gör ont" won the contest that year.

On the Swedish singles chart, the single peaked at number 8. The song also stayed at Svensktoppen for eleven weeks during the period of 4 April-13 June 2004., topping the chart three times before leaving it.

Charts

References

External links
Information at Svensk mediedatabas
Information at Svensk mediedatabas

2004 songs
2004 singles
After Dark (drag act) songs
Melodifestivalen songs of 2004
Swedish-language songs